Yves Sillard is a French scientist and High public servant who played a major role in the development of the French space program (Ariane). He headed the CNES, IFREMER, and the Délégation générale pour l'armement (General Directorate for Armament).

Biography in short 

1936 Birth in Coutances (Manche)

1954 enters École polytechnique

1957 chooses the Corps de l'armement

1959 graduates from Supaéro

1964 Secrétariat général à l'Aviation civile, Programme manager for Concorde

1969-1971 Head of the Centre spatial guyanais

1976-1982 General Director of the CNES

1982-1988 CEO of IFREMER

1989-1993 Délégué général pour l'armement

1994-1997 CEO Défense conseil international

1998 Assistant General Secretary for Scientific and Environmental Affairs at NATO

Books by Yves Sillard (in French) 
 5 Avril 2007, Cherche Midi, Phénomènes aérospatiaux non identifiés: Un défi pour la science

References 

École Polytechnique alumni
Corps de l'armement
Year of birth missing (living people)
Living people